Nadia Petrova was the defending champion, but she chose to compete in Eastbourne instead.
Simona Halep won the title beating in the final Kirsten Flipkens, 6–4, 6–2.

Seeds

Draw

Finals

Top half

Bottom half

Qualifying

Seeds

Qualifiers

Draw

First qualifier

Second qualifier

Third qualifier

Fourth qualifier

References
 Main Draw
 Qualifying Draw

Topshelf Openandnbsp;- Singles
2013 Women's Singles